Scarborough Building Society was a UK building society, which had its headquarters in Scarborough, North Yorkshire, England. Scarborough Building Society was formed in May 1846 - It was a member of the Building Societies Association.

On 30 March 2009 the building society merged with the Skipton Building Society and now operates under the Skipton brand.

History
The Society was founded as 'The Scarborough and North and East Yorkshire Permanent Building and Investment Society' and it wasn't until 1903 that the current name was adopted.

The Society's initial objectives were to provide a safe haven for investors' money - and the finance to enable people to build or buy their own homes. The original investment rate was 5% and the first mortgage was for £120.

In 1939 the Society opened its first Head Office, when York House was built in York Place, Scarborough, providing both office accommodation and a full branch. York Place remained in the business as a branch until 2006 when Scarborough's premier town centre branch was relocated to the former Burger King store in Westborough.

The first Scarborough Building Society out of town branch was opened in Bridlington in 1955, and from then onwards new branches were opened throughout Yorkshire and into Teesside and the East Midlands. The present 9-strong branch network continues to be a central part of its expanding business.

Direct postal and telephone services were embraced in the early 1990s and the Investments Direct Service was created in 1991, taking the Scarborough investment brand to the whole of the United Kingdom. In 1998 direct service for mortgages was formalised with the opening of a Direct Mortgage Centre.

The assets now exceed £2.8 billion, making it the 17th largest building society in the UK.

In July 2008 Scarborough Building Society announced the appointment of Robin Litten as its new Chief Executive, to replace John Carrier who retires from the post on 31 December 2008.

Merger with the Skipton Building Society

Due to pressures of the credit crunch and poor lending the Scarborough needed to find a 'safe' building society to be taken over by. On 3 November 2008, Skipton and Scarborough Building Societies announced their intended merger in a joint statement: "This is a real opportunity for the two North Yorkshire-based societies to create an enlarged Society that is even better placed to deal with any future uncertainties in the financial marketplace. The two societies are well matched, having similar business models, a strong geographical fit and shared commitment to mutuality, their members, their people and their local communities.

"Scarborough Building Society has seen difficult trading conditions leading to a substantial impact on profit and a resultant weakening capital position. In addition, the board of Scarborough has considered the possible impacts of continuing house price falls and the impending recession in the UK, and has concluded that the effect would be an unacceptable reduction in its capital resources and that, to fully protect the interests of its members, it should approach Skipton Building Society as its preferred merger partner".

David Cutter will become chief executive of the enlarged Society, which will be called Skipton Building Society and will be headquartered at The Bailey, Skipton. As previously announced, the current chief executives of both societies, John Goodfellow and John Carrier, will continue with their planned retirements on 31 December 2008.

The enlarged Society is now the fifth largest building society with approximately 860,000 members and over £16 billion of assets.

During the take over, all employees from the original Scarborough Build Society were made redundant and the headquarters was moved to Skipton.

References

External links
Scarborough Building Society (Skipton BS website)
Building Societies Association
KPMG Building Societies Database 2015

Banks established in 1846
Banks disestablished in 2009
Companies based in Scarborough, North Yorkshire
1846 establishments in England